CVR Partners LP is a public traded company, based in  Sugar Land, Texas, that manufactures and provides nitrogen fertilizer products. It is a subsidiary of Coffeyville Resources, which is owned by CVR Energy Inc. The company was formed by CVR Energy to operate its nitrogen fertilizer business. CVR Energy, Inc. was listed as a 2012 Fortune 500 company with NO.5 ranking in Houston Chronicle.

Background
The main products of CVR Partners include ammonia and urea ammonium nitrate (UAN). Its customer base consists of agricultural and industrial customers, including United Suppliers, Inc., Brandt Consolidated Inc., Gavilon Fertilizer, LLC, Transammonia, Inc., Agri Services of Brunswick, LLC, Interchem, and CHS Inc, Tessenderlo Kerley, Inc., National Cooperative Refinery Association, and Dyno Nobel, Inc.

The production process is as follows:
First, the gasifier converts low priced petroleum coke into a hydrogen rich synthesis gas. Then synthesis gas is converted into anhydrous ammonia in an ultra ammonia plant. Lastly, the processed anhydrous ammonia is upgraded into UAN in an integrated UAN plant.

The production volume of the company in 2012 is 390,017 tons of ammonia, which was distributed to the customers in North Texas and Canada.

As of March 2016, the company has a market capitalization of $535 million with an enterprise value of $613 million.

References 

Chemical companies established in 2007
Companies listed on the New York Stock Exchange
2011 initial public offerings
2007 establishments in Texas
Manufacturing companies based in Texas